Robert G. Ritter  is an American  dentist and a co-founder of Ritter & Ramsey General and Cosmetic Dentistry based in Jupiter, Florida.

Career
Ritter is a graduate of Medical University of South Carolina College of Dental Medicine. He 
is known for his contributions in esthetic dentistry. He has written and published several articles on adhesive and cosmetic dentistry. He speaks and lectures on cosmetic dentistry, implant dentistry, and other aspects of general dentistry across the US.

Ritter is an adjunct assistant clinical professor, prosthodontics and operative dentistry, Dental Research Administration at Tufts University School of Dental Medicine. He is a former president of the Florida Academy of Cosmetic Dentistry and a member of the Seaside Study Club.

Ritter is a board member of Inside Dentistry and The Journal of The Academy of Cosmetic Dentistry. He is also an editorial board member of REALITY, a publication for dentists.

Professional memberships
Ritter is a member of the following professional associations:
 The American Academy of Esthetic Dentistry 
 The American Academy of Restorative Dentistry
 The American Society for Dental Aesthetics 
 The American Society for Color and Appearance Dentistry 
 The American Academy of Cosmetic Dentistry
 The  American Dental Association
 The International Association for Dental Research

Personal life
Ritter is married to his wife Isabelle and they have a daughter, Olivia. He resides with his family in Palm Beach Gardens, Florida.

References

External links
 Ritter & Ramsey General and Cosmetic Dentistry  Website

Living people
American dentists
American dentistry academics
American physicians
Year of birth missing (living people)